Broughton in Furness is a market town in the civil parish of Broughton West in the South Lakeland district of Cumbria, England. It had a population of 529 at the 2011 Census. It is located on the south western boundary of England's Lake District National Park in the Furness region of Cumbria, which was originally part of Lancashire before 1974.

History 
Broughton in Furness is mentioned in the Domesday Book as one of the townships forming the Manor of Hougun held by Tostig Godwinson, Earl of Northumbria. Dating from around the eleventh century, the original settlement grew to become the local market town for both fishing and agriculture. Wool was particularly important for the town's development. The town was given a charter in 1575.

Market Square was formally laid out in 1760 by John Gilpin Sawrey, the Lord of the Manor, who lived at Broughton Tower,a large mansion just a short distance from the Square. In the 1990s the A595 road was diverted in an attempt to improve the environment of the town and help it retain its rural feel.

Governance 
With Cumbria having retained its two-tier local authority structure, Broughton is located within the Cumbria County Council and the South Lakeland District Council areas. In 1976 the parish councils of Broughton West, Dunnerdale-with-Seathwaite, and Angerton were merged, creating Duddon Parish Council.

Geography 
It lies near the River Duddon, just inland from the coastal hamlet of Foxfield. Duddon Mosses is a site of special scientific interest with deer, lizards, adders and barn owls.

With just 529 residents, in terms of population, Broughton-in-Furness ranks 5,721 of the 7,727 towns in the UK according to the 2011 census.

Economy 
Traditionally the economy was based on fishing and agriculture; there is a regular livestock market. The creation of the National Park in the 1950s produced some tourism for the area, though most tourists still head further north or east into the central lakes. There is a Tourist Information Centre located in the main square.

Culture and community 
The Victory Hall has been recently refurbished with Lottery funding and puts on plays and musical events. The town contains, amongst other shops, a Post Office/newsagents, a grocer/butcher, a bakery and a number of pubs/restaurants.

The central obelisk in the town square was constructed to mark the Jubilee of King George III in 1810. Syke House on the western approach is an attractive listed building with datestones of 1655 and 1740.

There is a thriving tennis club with two outdoor courts and there is sailing on Coniston Water. Eccle Riggs is a Victorian manor house to the south of town that is now a leisure club.

Transport 

The Furness Railway opened the line from Kirkby to Broughton station in 1848; the 
Whitehaven and Furness Junction Railway - which amalgamated with the Furness Railway in 1866 - opened its line from Whitehaven into Broughton station in 1850. In 1859, the nominally independent Coniston Railway - which amalgamated with the Furness Railway in 1862 - extended the line through Broughton to Coniston. Nearly 100 years after the opening of the Coniston line, in 1958, the line closed to passengers, goods traffic continuing until 1962, at which point the line was closed and dismantled, the route of which is now a public bridleway for approximately  towards Coniston.

The main west-coast road, the A595, used to pass through Broughton until the road along Duddon Mosses through Foxfield was designated as the A595. The stretch of road through Broughton has been designated the number C5009, although A595 can still be seen on older road signage.

Education 
There is a Church of England primary school in the town. The old school house, now a private residence, can still be seen on Church Street, close to the pathway to the church.

There are no secondary schools in Broughton with children usually attending John Ruskin School in Coniston, Ulverston Victoria High School or Windermere School. Young people frequently travel to Barrow-in-Furness to attend Furness College and  Barrow Sixth Form College from the age of 16.

Church 

The Anglican church dedicated to St Mary Magdalene has its roots in Saxon times but the oldest part of the current building dates to the 12th century.

It is an active Anglican parish church in the deanery of Furness, the archdeaconry of Westmorland and Furness, and the diocese of Carlisle. Its benefice is united with those of four other local parishes. The church is recorded in the National Heritage List for England as a designated Grade II listed building.

Notable people 
 Richard Parsons is the author of a series of best-selling GCSE study guides. 
 Sir Robin Philipson RA (1916–1992) was born in the town.
 Branwell Brontë, brother of the famous literary sisters, lived in Broughton for six months in 1840.

See also 

 Listed buildings in Broughton West
 Local Government Act 1972 
 Cumbria County Council 
 South Lakeland 
 Barrow and Furness (UK Parliament constituency)

References

External links

Cumbria County History Trust: Broughton-in-Furness (nb: provisional research only - see Talk page)
 Visit Broughton Website
The Cumbria Directory - Broughton-in-Furness
Visit Cumbria - Broughton-in-Furness

 
Market towns in Cumbria
Furness
Towns in Cumbria
South Lakeland District